Ashot Aristakesovich Sahratyan (July 2, 1936 – November 20, 2015) was an Armenian-Russian poet, translator and artist. He was awarded the Golden Pushkin medal.

In 1958 Sahratyan graduated from Yerevan State University and later worked as a lecturer at the Maxim Gorky Literature Institute from 1969 to 1995. He was a member of the Board of the Translators' Union of Russia.

References

External links
 Biography

Armenian male poets
Russian people of Armenian descent
Writers from Moscow
2015 deaths
1936 births
Russian male poets
Armenian translators
20th-century Russian translators